The Nargun and The Stars is a children's fantasy novel set in Australia, written by Patricia Wrightson. It was among the first Australian books for children to draw on Australian Aboriginal mythology. The book was the winner of the 1974 Children's Book Council of Australia Children's Book of the Year Award for Older Readers, and Patricia Wrightson was awarded an Order of the British Empire in 1977, largely for this work.

The story was adapted for television and screened as a mini-series in Australia in 1981.

Plot 
The story is set in Australia, and involves an orphaned city boy named Simon Brent who comes to live on a 5000-acre sheep station called Wongadilla, in the Hunter Region, with his mother's second cousins, Edie and Charlie. In a remote valley on the property he discovers a variety of ancient Australian Aboriginal Dreamtime creatures. The arrival of heavy machinery intent on clearing the land brings to life the ominous stone Nargun. The Nargun is a creature drawn from tribal legends of the Gunai or Kurnai people of the area now known as the Mitchell River National Park in Victoria. Other creatures featured in the story include the mischievous green-scaled water-spirit Potkoorok, the Turongs (tree people) and the Nyols (cave people).

Editions 

English editions of The Nargun and the Stars by P. Wrightson:

 1973 by Hutchinson (London and Sydney). 
 1974 by Atheneum Books (New York). 
 1975 by Puffin Books, illustrated. 
 1973 by Puffin Books (Penguin Books). 
 1973 by Hutchinson (London) 
 1986 by M. K. McElderry Books (New York). 
 1988 by Hutchinson (Australia), illustrated by Robert Ingpen. 
 2001 by Bt Bound. 
 2008 by University of Queensland Press. 
 2009 by Phoenix Education, illustrated. 
 2009 by Catnip. 

Non-English editions of The Nargun and the Stars:

 (Afrikaans) Die Nargan en die sterre, published by Kaapstad : Human & Rousseau : World International, 1990 
 (Finnish) Nargun ja tähdet, published by Hki : Tammi, 1988 
 (German) Das Nargun und die Sterne, published by Friedrich Oetinger, Hamburg. 1990 
 (Japanese) 星に叫ぶ岩ナルガン / (Hoshi ni sakebu iwa narugan), published by 評論社, Hyōronsha, Shōwa 57 (Tokyo) 1982 
 (Slovenian) Simon in kamniti tujec, published by Mladinska knjiga, Ljubljana, 1979 
 (Spanish) El Nargun y las estrellas, published by Ediciones Alfaguara, Madrid, 1987 
 (Swedish) Nargonen och stjärnorna, published by Berghs Förlag, Malmö 1980

Awards 

 Won – CBCA Children's Book of the Year Award: Older Readers (1974)

Television mini-series 

The story was made into a mini-series for television in 1977–1978 by the Australian Broadcasting Corporation, the screenplay adapted by Margaret Kelly. The producer was Lynn Bayonas. The series contained five episodes, each of thirty minutes duration, was first screened on 15 September 1981.

References 

1973 Australian novels
Children's fantasy novels
Novels set in Australia
Novels by Patricia Wrightson
CBCA Children's Book of the Year Award-winning works
Hutchinson (publisher) books
Novels about orphans
Australian children's novels
Australian fantasy novels
1973 children's books
Mythology in written fiction